Ram Mohan Paruvu (born 21 May 1969) is an Indian film screenwriter, producer, and director known for his works in Telugu cinema. He owns the production house Sunshine Cinemas.

Early career
Ram Mohan was born into a Telugu speaking family from Amalapuram, Andhra Pradesh. He produced Ashta Chamma and Golconda High School under his production company Art Beat Capital and later he started producing films under Sunshine Cinemas, a Telugu movie production company established in April, 2012.

Sunshine Cinemas 
Sunshine Cinemas is Ram Mohan P's production house set to focus on commercial films with family viewing sensibilities. Currently operating out of Hyderabad and in the Telugu language domain, they choose to work with upcoming directors, writers and actors.  Centered on storytelling as their core, they provide support to young crews at all stages, taking films into production and distribution through strategic alliances with leading players. The first film under the Sunshine Cinemas banner is Ram's 2013 film Uyyala Jampala.

Filmography

Recognition 
Sify stated of Ashta Chamma, that it was a "complete family entertainer" inspired from the works of Oscar Wilde and that it "is fun to watch due to the cute subject". They expanded that it was a "completely dialogue-based comedy coupled with good performances, music, and lyrics, keeping audience through the twists nevertheless. The first half is more enjoyable than the second half that has numerous twists." Concurring, GreatAndhra wrote that the film's theme was silly, but dealt with hilariously. The film's music received special mention, in that with the song Aadinchi Astachemma Odinchavamma "composition and lyrical value is interesting and captivating", and the song Hello Antoo Pilichi was "purposefully taken in old style."

Rediff Movies stated that based upon the novel The Men Within by Harimohan Paruvu, the film Golconda High School is brilliant,  and India Glitz praised the film, calling it "inspirational".

Of Uyyala Jampala, The Deccan Chronicle wrote that while "a predictable love story" it was "narrated well."  Both written and produced by Ram Mohan P, it was stated that the film "is an earnest love story without unnecessary embellishments. There are no big action scenes, no vulgar dialogues, no unpredictable twists and turns; the story, told in flashback, unfolds simply."  It was concluded "All in all, the movie impresses despite having a predictable plot with good dialogues, a reasonable length — thanks to clever editing — and amazing cinematography. A much better fare than your staple masala flick – go for it."  The Hindu made note that for a low-budget film it compared well with large-budget efforts, and released during the Christmas season, it resonated well with viewers, and International Business Times shared numerous positive reviews of the film and wrote that overall it was a "breezy love story worth watching".

Personal life 
His brother Harimohan Paruvu is an English writer.

Awards & nominations 
 2014, 'Best Film' nomination by Telugu Film Industry's Filmfare Awards South for Uyyala Jampala (2013).
 2009, 'Best Film' nomination by Telugu Film Industry's Filmfare Awards South for Ashta Chamma (2008).

References

External links
 
 Ashta Chamma at the Internet Movie Database
 Golconda High School at the Internet Movie Database

Telugu film producers
Film producers from Hyderabad, India
1969 births
Living people